Suzhou Industrial Park railway station or Suzhou Yuanqu railway station is a railway station of Shanghai–Nanjing Intercity Railway located in Suzhou Industrial Park, Suzhou, Jiangsu, People's Republic of China.

Layout
This station's area is 8120 squared metres. It has three floors (2 above ground and 1 underground). It has 5 tracks and 3 platforms.
To enter the station, passengers can use the escalator from the ground floor to the ticket office or to the waiting hall on the 2nd floor. Passengers can exit the station through the underground passage to reach the bus station north or west of the square. There is a designated taxi pick-up area underground.

Transport
This station has 11 bus routes:

Metro station
It is served by Line 3 and will be served by Line 8 of Suzhou Rail Transit.

Gallery

References

Railway stations in Jiangsu
Railway stations in Suzhou
Suzhou Industrial Park
Railway stations in China opened in 2010
Stations on the Shanghai–Nanjing Intercity Railway
Stations on the Nantong-Suzhou-Jiaxing Intercity High-Speed Railway